Gettu betur is an Icelandic team quiz show, broadcast on public television channel RÚV. Each team consists of three students from one of Iceland's high schools or colleges. Two teams play against each other in each episode. Two preliminary rounds are broadcast on radio station Rás 2, followed by televised quarter-final, semi-final and final rounds on RÚV. Thirty schools participated in the 2011 season. The current host is Kristjana Arnarsdóttir.

Gettu betur was first held in 1986. Menntaskólinn í Reykjavík has won the contest 20 times overall, first in 1988, and then eleven times in a row, from 1993 to 2003, from 2007 to 2010 and in 2012, 2013, 2015 and 2016. The only other schools to win more than once are Menntaskólinn á Akureyri, with three wins and Kvennaskólinn í Reykjavík with two.

Seasons

Board game
A competitive trivia board game based on the show was introduced in 2001, containing over 2000 question cards. A lighter family edition was also published subsequently.

Appearances in popular culture

The show has a prominent role in the plot of Arndís Þórarinsdóttir's 2011 novel Játningar mjólkurfernuskálds.

External links

References

1980s game shows
1990s game shows
2000s game shows
2010s game shows
2000s Icelandic television series
2010s Icelandic television series
1990s Icelandic television series
1980s Icelandic television series
RÚV original programming